Weary is a surname, and may refer to:
 Jake Weary (born 1990), American actor, musician, singer-songwriter and music producer
 Fred Weary (offensive lineman) (born 1977), American football guard
 Fred Weary (defensive back) (born 1974), former American football cornerback 
 Emily Pohl-Weary (born 1973), Canadian novelist, professor and editor